Euaspidoceras is an extinct ammonoid cephalopod genus that lived during the Middle Jurassic.

Ancestor of Euaspidoceras is probably Aspidoceras. It is considered related to genera like Orthaspidoceras, Simaspidoceras, and Intranodites.

Species
Euaspidoceras ajax  Leanza 1947
Euaspidoceras davouxi  Bert and Bonnot 2004
Euaspidoceras babeanum  d’Orbigny, 1848
Euaspidoceras perarmatum  J. Sowerby, 1822
Euaspidoceras veranadaense  Parent 2006

Distribution
Euaspidoceras species may be found in the Jurassic of Argentina, France, Germany, India, Italy, Madagascar, Saudi Arabia, Spain, the United Kingdom and Yemen.

References
Notes

Bibliography
Arkell, et al.,1957. Mesozoic Ammonoidea; Treatise on Invertebrate Paleontology, Part L (Ammonoidea). Geol Soc of America and Univ Kansas Press. p. L338-339.

External links 
Jura-Ammoniten Peter Reiter

Jurassic ammonites
Ammonites of Europe
Callovian first appearances
Late Jurassic extinctions
Ammonitida genera
Aspidoceratidae